The 2007 Fed Cup was the 45th edition of the most important competition between national teams in women's tennis.

The final took place at the Luzhniki Palace of Sports in Moscow, Russia, on 15–16 September. The home team, Russia, defeated the defending champions, Italy, 0–4, giving Russia their third title in four years.

World Group

Draw

World Group play-offs

The four losing teams in the World Group first round ties (Belgium, China, Japan and Spain), and four winners of the World Group II ties (Austria, Czech Republic, Germany and Israel) entered the draw for the World Group play-offs.

Date: 14–15 July

World Group II

The World Group II was the second highest level of Fed Cup competition in 2007. Winners advanced to the World Group play-offs, and losers played in the World Group II play-offs.

Date: 21–22 April

World Group II play-offs

The four losing teams from World Group II (Australia, Canada, Croatia and Slovakia) played off against qualifiers from Zonal Group I. Two teams qualified from Europe/Africa Zone (Serbia and Ukraine), one team from the Asia/Oceania Zone (Chinese Taipei), and one team from the Americas Zone (Argentina).

Date: 14–15 July

Americas Zone

 Nations in bold advanced to the higher level of competition.
 Nations in italics were relegated down to a lower level of competition.

Group I
Venue: Pilara Tenis Club, Buenos Aires, Argentina (outdoor clay)

Dates: 18–21 April

Participating Teams

Group II
Venue: Carrasco Lawn Tennis Club, Montevideo, Uruguay (outdoor clay)

Dates: 16–21 April

Participating Teams

Asia/Oceania Zone

 Nations in bold advanced to the higher level of competition.
 Nations in italics were relegated down to a lower level of competition.

Group I
Venue: Scenic Circles Hotel Tennis Centre, Christchurch, New Zealand (outdoor hard)

Dates: 16–21 April

Participating Teams

Europe/Africa Zone

 Nations in bold advanced to the higher level of competition.
 Nations in italics were relegated down to a lower level of competition.

Group I
Venue: TC Lokomotiv, Plovdiv, Bulgaria (outdoor clay)

Dates: 18–21 April

Participating Teams

Group II
Venue: National Tennis Centre, Vacoas-Phoenix, Mauritius (outdoor hard)

Dates: 17–20 April

Participating Teams

Group III
Venue: National Tennis Centre, Vacoas-Phoenix, Mauritius (outdoor hard)

Dates: 23–27 April

Participating Teams

Rankings
The rankings were measured after the three points during the year that play took place, and were collated by combining points earned from the previous four years.

References

External links 
 Fed Cup

 
Billie Jean King Cups by year
Fed Cup
2007 in women's tennis